Richard J. Donovan (February 24, 1926 - November 21, 1971) served in the California State Assembly for the 77th district from 1963 to 1966 and during World War II he served in the United States Navy.

California has named the Richard J. Donovan Correctional Facility after him.

Resolved by the Assembly of the State of California, the Senate thereof concurring, a majority of all the members elected to each house voting therefor and concurring therein, That the amendments to the Charter of the City of Sacramento, as proposed to, and adopted and ratified by, the electors of the city, as hereinabove fully set forth, are hereby approved as a whole, without alteration or amendment, for and as amendments to, and as part of, the Charter of the City of Sacramento.

CALIFORNIA LEGISLATURE-1971 REGULAR SESSION
Assembly Concurrent Resolution No. 188
Introduced by Assemblymen Deddeh, Arnett, Badham, Bagley, Barnes, Bee, Belotti, Beverly, Biddle, Brathwaite, Briggs, Brophy, Brown, Burke, Burton, Campbell, Chacon, Chappie, Cline, Collier, Conrad, Cory, Crown, Cullen, Davis, Dent, Duffy, Dunlap, Fenton, Fong, Foran, Garcia, Gonsalves, Bill Greene, Leroy F. Greene, Hayden, Hayes, Harvey Johnson, Ray E. Johnson, Karabian, Ketchum, Keysor, Knox, LaCoste, Lanterman, Lewis, MacDonald, MacGillivray, Maddy, McAlister, McCarthy, Meade, Miller, Mobley, Monagan, Moorhead, Moretti, Murphy, Pierson, Porter, Powers, Priolo, Quimby, Ralph, Russell, Ryan, Schabarum, Seeley, Sieroty, Stacey, Stull, Thomas, Townsend, Vasconcellos, Wakefield, Warren, Waxman, Wilson, Wood, and Z'berg

November 22, 1971
WITHOUT REFERENCE TO COMMITTEE
Assembly Concurrent Resolution No. 188—Relative to the Honorable Richard J. Donovan. 
LEGISLATIVE COUNSEL’S DIGEST ACR 188, as amended, Deddeh (W.R.T.C.). Richard J. Donovan. Expresses regret of Legislature at death of former Assemblyman Richard J. Donovan. Fiscal Committee—No.

WHEREAS, It was with deep sadness that the members learned of the untimely death on November 21, 1971, of former Member of the Assembly, Richard J. Donovan; 
and
WHEREAS, Born in New York, Richard J. Donovan settled in California in 1945, during his distinguished service in the United States Navy; and WHEREAS, Educated at San Diego State College and the University of San Diego Law School, Richard J. Donovan brought broad experience to the Assembly, as a businessman, a peace officer, and clerk of the municipal court; and WHEREAS, First elected to the Assembly in 1962, Richard J. Donovan distinguished himself in that body with his rare combination of youth and experience; and WHEREAS, Appointed to the municipal court bench in 1967, Richard J. Donovan performed his judicial duties with honor and distinction, bringing his invaluable legislative service in enacting law to the difficult and demanding task of interpreting and enforcing the law, and his interpretations and enforcement of the law were tempered by common sense and compassion for his fellow man; and WHEREAS, The tragic loss of Richard J. Donovan is a loss shared by all of the people of the State of California whom he loved and served so well; now, therefore, be it Resolved by the Assembly of the State of California, the Senate thereof concurring, That the Members express their deep sense of loss and deepest regrets to Mrs. Peggy Donovan and Elizabeth and Roxanne Donovan, the widow and children of the Honorable Richard J. Donovan; and be it further Resolved, That the Chief Clerk of the Assembly transmit suitably prepared copies of this resolution to Mrs. Peggy Donovan and Elizabeth and Roxanne Donovan.

References

United States Navy personnel of World War I
1971 deaths
1926 births
20th-century American politicians
Republican Party members of the California State Assembly